Stapenhill is a civil parish in the district of East Staffordshire, Staffordshire, England.  The parish contains five listed buildings that are recorded in the National Heritage List for England.  All the listed buildings are designated at Grade II, the lowest of the three grades, which is applied to "buildings of national importance and special interest".  
The parish is in the eastern part of the town of Burton upon Trent.  The listed buildings are a timber framed farmhouse, a town house, the gateway to a cemetery, a church, and a footbridge.


Buildings

References

Citations

Sources

Lists of listed buildings in Staffordshire